The Malling School is a mixed high school located in East Malling in the English county of Kent.

History
It opened as Clare Secondary School in 1957, designed by Read & McDermott.

Present day
It is a foundation school administered by Kent County Council, who coordinate admissions to the school.

The Malling School offers GCSEs, BTECs as programmes of study for pupils at Key Stage 4, while students in the sixth form have the option to study International Baccalaureate programmes of study and further BTECs.

It was inspected by Ofsted and found to require improvement in June 2019.

Description
The school is smaller than the average-sized secondary school, with a small sixth form with more boys than girls. It is a non-selective school in an area with selective schools, so the students enter the school with lower previous achievement than average. Most are White British with a below-average proportion of students are from minority ethnic groups. The proportion of students who receive support through the pupil premium is higher than average, and about a quarter of Year 7 students receive catch-up funding for students who failed to attain the nationally expected level in English or mathematics at the end of Key Stage 2. The school has a specially resourced unit, the Tydeman Centre, for 90 students who have statements of special educational needs for speech, language and communication needs.

References

External links
The Malling School official website  With link to Transition Video.

Secondary schools in Kent
Tonbridge and Malling
Foundation schools in Kent